Solaris Acoustic is an acoustic album by English pop rock band Elliot Minor. The album was released on 15 November 2010 along with a live DVD (Kerrang! Live Special) filmed at the Relentless Garage, London.

Track listing

Bonus tracks

Personnel
Alex Davies – lead and backing vocals, acoustic guitars, piano, string arrangements
Ed Minton – lead and backing vocals, acoustic guitars

Kerrang! Live Special DVD

Music videos for:
"Discover (Why the Love Hurts)"
"Solaris"
"Electric High"
"I Believe"

Personnel
Alex Davies – lead and backing vocals, lead guitars
Ed Minton – lead and backing vocals, rhythm guitars
Teddy Hetherton – bass guitars
Ali Paul – keyboards
Dan Hetherton – drums, backing vocals

References

2010 albums
Elliot Minor albums